María Antonia Ruth Sautu (born 25 February 1932) is an Argentine sociologist and methodologist.

She is a professor emeritus at the University of Buenos Aires (UBA), and she works as a researcher and project director at its Gino Germani Research Institute.

She received the Bernardo Houssay Career Award in 2004.

Academic career
María Antonia Ruth Sautu was born in Buenos Aires on 25 February 1932. She earned a bachelor's degree as a national public accountant at UBA in 1952. She also studied economics at the same university, obtaining a licentiate in 1960.

She did postgraduate studies at the UBA's Faculty of Philosophy and Letters, and in 1962 she obtained a Certificate of Sociological Studies for Graduates from its Department of Sociology. After completing her postgraduate studies, she moved to England in 1969, for which she obtained scholarships from the Ford Foundation, the National Scientific and Technical Research Council (CONICET) and the Torcuato di Tella Institute. At the London School of Economics, she completed a doctorate in economics with a focus in sociology, with the thesis Economic Development and Stratification in Argentina: 1869–1955.

Sautu returned to Argentina and devoted herself fully to university teaching and research, working at various institutions. She was an associate researcher at the di Tella Institute's Center for Social Research from 1964 to 1974, and was also an associate researcher at Harvard University's Population Center, under the direction of professor , from March to April 1969. She has been a profesora titular regular of the Chair of Methodology and Techniques of Social Research of the sociology program of UBA's Faculty of Social Sciences since 1986. Since 2005, she has held her profesora regular role as a professor emeritus at UBA.

She has also written several books, including El empresario y la innovación (1972) and Manual de Metodología. Construcción del marco teórico, formulación de los objetivos y elección de la metodología (2005). She has also been the compiler and author of journal articles such as "Práctica de la Investigación Cuantitativa y Cualitativa. Articulación entre la Teoría, los Métodos y las Técnicas" (2007).

Public service
From December 1983 to December 1987, Sautu served as Undersecretary of Industry and Commerce of the Economy Ministry of Buenos Aires Province. From May 1988 to May 1989, she was a cabinet advisor to the national executive branch's Secretariat of Housing and Environmental Management.

Also, from June to December 1989, she served as Senior Industrial Development Officer of the United Nations Industrial Development Organization (UNIDO) in Vienna.

Sautu participated in science and technology studies that led to the design of national laws and programs for science and technology. From 1997 to 2005, she was a member of the Evaluation Commission for scientific quality certificates at the Ministry of Science, Technology, and Productive Innovation.

Awards and distinctions
 1986: Konex Diploma of Merit in Sociology
 2004: Bernardo Houssay Career Award
 2011: Lifetime Achievement Award at UBA's 190th anniversary

Selected publications
 
  (coauthor with Ana María Eichelbaum de Babini)
 
  (coauthor with Amalia Eguía)
  (coauthor with Catalina Wainerman)
 
 
 
  (coauthor)
 
  (collective work)
 
 
  (coauthor with Betina Freidin and María Mercedes Di Virgilio)

References

External links
 Ruth Sautu at the UBA Gino Germani Research Institute 

1932 births
21st-century Argentine women scientists
Alumni of the London School of Economics
Argentine sociologists
Argentine women sociologists
Living people
United Nations Industrial Development Organization people
University of Buenos Aires alumni
Academic staff of the University of Buenos Aires